The Thornton River is a  river in the U.S. state of Virginia.  It rises at Thornton Gap in Shenandoah National Park and flows east through Rappahannock County, running parallel to U.S. Route 211 until it reaches the town of Sperryville. Continuing east into Culpeper County, the Thornton River joins the Hazel River, a tributary of the Rappahannock River, and thus part of the Chesapeake Bay watershed.

See also
List of rivers in Virginia

References

Rivers of Virginia
Tributaries of the Rappahannock River
Rivers of Culpeper County, Virginia
Rivers of Rappahannock County, Virginia